SRP receptor alpha subunit is a protein that in humans is encoded by the SRPRA gene.

Function

The gene encodes a subunit of the endoplasmic reticulum signal recognition particle receptor that, in conjunction with the signal recognition particle, is involved in the targeting and translocation of signal sequence tagged secretory and membrane proteins across the endoplasmic reticulum. Alternative splicing results in multiple transcript variants.

References

Further reading 

Genes
Human proteins